Everything (no Cantonese title) is a 1990 Cantonese album recorded by Chinese Cantopop singer Faye Wong when she was based in Hong Kong and recording under the Cantonese name: 王靖雯 Wong Ching Man (Shirley Wong).

The title song is a Cantonese version of Jody Watley's 1989 hit of the same name. "Wailing Wall" is a cover of Marilyn Martin's 1988 B-side "Quiet Desperation".

Track listing
 巴黎塔尖 (Baa Lai Taap Zim) - Paris Eiffel Tower Tip
 "Everything"
 遊蕩 (Jau Dong) - Roaming
 可否抱緊我 (Ho Fau Pou Gan Ngo) - Can You Hold Me Tight
 鬥快說笑話 (Dau Faai Syut Siu Waa) - Competing To Joke Quickly
 My Loneliness
 哭牆 (Huk Coeng) - Wailing Wall
 無悔今夜 (Mou Fui Gam Je) - No Regrets Tonight
 一剎那 (Jat Saat Naa) - In A Flash
 激流 (Gik Lau) - Upstream
 巴黎塔尖 (Baa Lai Taap Zim) - Paris Eiffel Tower Tip (Reprise)

References

1990 albums
Faye Wong albums
Cinepoly Records albums
Cantopop albums